Julien Benneteau and Jo-Wilfried Tsonga defeated Mariusz Fyrstenberg and Marcin Matkowski in the final, 6–2, 6–4 to win the doubles tennis title at the 2009 Shanghai Masters.

Seeds
All eight seeds receive a bye into the second round.

Draw

Finals

Top half

Bottom half

External links
 Main Draw Doubles

Shanghai ATP Masters 1000 - Doubles
2009 Shanghai ATP Masters 1000